Kalinik is the Serbian variant of the name Callinicus.

See also
 Patriarch Kalinik (disambiguation)

Serbian masculine given names